PolyGram Filmed Entertainment (formerly known as Filmworks, Casablanca Records & Filmworks, PolyGram Films and PolyGram Pictures or simply PFE) was a British and American film studio founded in 1975 as an American film studio, which became a European competitor to Hollywood within decades, but was eventually sold to Seagram Company Ltd. in 1998 and was folded in 2000. Among its most successful and well known films were The Deep (1977), Midnight Express (1978), An American Werewolf in London (1981), Flashdance (1983), Four Weddings and a Funeral (1994), Dead Man Walking (1995), The Big Lebowski (1998),  Fargo (1996), The Usual Suspects (1995), The Game (1997) and Notting Hill (1999).

In 1975, Peter Guber formed its own production company FilmWorks, then in 1976, it became Casablanca Records & FilmWorks after a merger with Casablanca Records, which PolyGram got a 50% by 1977, and by 1980, PolyGram took the other 50% stake in the company and renamed the film unit as PolyGram Pictures. During the late 1980s and early 1990s, PolyGram continued to invest in a diversified film unit with the purchases of individual production companies. In 1995, PolyGram purchased ITC Entertainment for $156 million. In May 1998, PolyGram was sold to Seagram, which owned Universal Pictures and Universal Music Group, for $10 billion. Seagram sold off some of PolyGram's assets while mainly acquiring its music division. The ITC Entertainment library was sold to Carlton Communications for £91 million, the pre-April 1996 PolyGram Filmed Entertainment library was sold to Metro-Goldwyn-Mayer (MGM), and PolyGram's US distributor was sold to USA Networks. After many of its assets were sold, the remains of PolyGram's film division was folded into Universal Pictures. When the newly formed entertainment division of Seagram faced financial difficulties, it was sold to Vivendi, and MCA became known as Universal Studios, as Seagram ceased to exist. Vivendi remained the majority owner of the Universal Music Group until 2021, when it sold most of its stake, MGM owns the rights to most of the pre-1996 library, and the remaining film and television library is owned by NBCUniversal. In 2017, Universal Music Group established a film and television division, resurrecting the PolyGram Entertainment name.

History

FilmWorks, Casablanca Records & FilmWorks and PolyGram Pictures 
In 1975, Peter Guber quit Columbia Pictures to start out FilmWorks with a producing deal. A year later, during the production of The Deep, it was merged with Casablanca Records to form Casablanca Records & FilmWorks. The company would enjoy success with The Deep and Midnight Express. The music company PolyGram (owned by Dutch-based Philips and Germany's Siemens) bought out its share of Casablanca Records & FilmWorks in 1977. Two years later, in 1979, Casablanca Record & Filmworks left Columbia Pictures to join Universal Pictures, and gave Casablanca Records & Filmworks creative control over the pictures. A year later, PolyGram took on its stake of the company and it was renamed to PolyGram Pictures in 1980. PolyGram reserved the finances and Guber would run as CEO. Guber would form a partnership with Barbra Streisand's hairdresser Jon Peters, who co-produced his client's A Star Is Born remake. Peters would produce PolyGram's films, and eventually become a stockholder with Guber. He had intended to work with Boardwalk Records, but he was forced to join PolyGram Pictures instead.

Its first film under the Universal/PolyGram alliance was King of the Mountain (1981), which was a box-office flop. More money-losers followed. Ancillary markets such as home video and pay television were not yet established, and broadcast television networks were paying less for licenses to films. PolyGram's European investors were not happy; they had lost about $80 million on its film division. Not long after, Siemens parted with Philips. Guber and Peters left PolyGram Pictures in 1982, taking their plans for a new Batman movie with them, along with a few other projects. The duo eventually found a home at Warner Bros. A part of their exit proceedings, PolyGram would still own 7.5% of profits from some of its projects, including the 1989 Batman film. Also in 1980, PolyGram launched a syndicated television division PolyGram Television, to be headed by former Columbia Pictures Television syndication executive Norman Horowitz, but both the film and TV units would eventually close down by 1983 after a string of three first-run syndication strip flops by 1982.

PolyGram Filmed Entertainment 
In the early 1980s, PolyGram Video was launched. PolyGram Video, headed by Michael Kuhn and David Hockman, was created to distribute concert films and feature films acquired from third-parties, as well as long-form music videos, and even had a video label, originally set up as a joint venture with Heron Communications, that was called Channel 5 Video. Kuhn and Hockman were able to parlay PolyGram Video's success into financing feature films. The first film produced by PolyGram's new film division was P.I. Private Investigations in 1987. During the late 1980s and early 1990s, PolyGram continued to invest in a diversified film unit with the purchases of individual production companies. In 1989, PolyGram launched Manifesto Film Sales to handle the licensing of films outside North America. In 1991, PolyGram's Michael Kuhn became the head of PolyGram Filmed Entertainment, with US$200 million pumped in with the intention of developing a European film studio that could produce and distribute films internationally on a scale to match the major Hollywood studios.

Following the style of its music business, the company produced films through a number of creatively semi-autonomous 'labels', such as Working Title Films in the UK and Propaganda Films and Interscope Communications in the United States; It also built up its own network of distribution companies.

Film production within PolyGram differed from traditional Hollywood studios, in that power to make ('green light') a film was not centralised in the hands of a small number of executives, but instead was decided by negotiations between producers, management and marketing. Kuhn claimed that "movies sort of green lit themselves."

In 1993, PolyGram purchased the video arm of Virgin Group from General Electric Capital for $5.6 million and remodeled the label as Vision Video Ltd.

PolyGram also built up a sizable film and television library that could be profitable. In 1995, the company purchased ITC Entertainment for $156 million. Through this purchase, PolyGram acquired 350 feature films, several thousand hours of television programming, and gained further access into the television market. That same year, PolyGram Filmed Entertainment acquired a 75% majority stake in British home video distributor Abbey Home Entertainment. In 1997, PFE agreed to purchase the Epic film library, which included a thousand feature films, from Crédit Lyonnais for $225 million. PolyGram also attempted purchasing MGM and The Samuel Goldwyn Company's library,  but to no avail. In July 1998, Polygram was in talks to sell their stake in Abbey Home Entertainment back to Ian and Anne Miles, letting AHE trade independently again. On December 7, 1997, PolyGram and Warner Bros. reached a deal to co-finance films produced by Castle Rock Entertainment.

PFE was based in the United Kingdom, and invested heavily in British film making — some credit it with reviving the British film industry in the 1990s. Despite a successful production history, Philips decided to sell PolyGram to the beverage (liquor) conglomerate Seagram in 1998.

Only interested in PolyGram's music operations, Seagram, which at the time controlled Universal Pictures, looked forward to divesting in PFE. After being dissatisfied with offers to buy the studio (including a joint venture between Canal+ and Artisan Entertainment), Seagram opted to sell off individual assets and folded whatever remained into Universal. In October 1998, Metro-Goldwyn-Mayer (MGM) paid $235–250 million to acquire 1,300 films released before March 31, 1996, from PolyGram. In 1999, the ITC library was sold to Carlton Communications (later known as ITV Studios) for $150 million. Some of PFE's North American distribution assets were sold to USA Networks. Universal would later take over the remaining titles which included a third of the pre-1996 films as well as PolyGram Television's library. Universal would eventually set up their international arm on the ashes of PFE's international division on February 9, 1999, that included theatrical and video distribution when its contracts with United International Pictures and CIC Video expired. After Mickey Blue Eyes flopped, which served as UPI's last film (one of the few titles that were self-distributed by Universal internationally), being inherited from PolyGram, all the theatrical assets of Universal Pictures International was merged with United International Pictures, which remained through 2007.

PolyGram Filmed Entertainment took over the distribution of Manga Entertainment's titles in Australia and New Zealand in late 1996 after Siren Entertainment's license to the Manga Video catalogue expired, but PolyGram lost the license to the Manga Video catalogue in 1998 after Madman Entertainment took over the licenses. This was due to Manga Entertainment being moved from Island Records to Palm Pictures.

Relaunch as PolyGram Entertainment

Production companies 
 Working Title Films (UK), acquired by PFE in 1991.
 Propaganda Films (US), acquired by PFE in 1991.
 Interscope Communications (US), acquired by PFE in 1994.
 Gramercy Pictures (US), launched by PFE and Universal in 1992.                                                                                    
 ITC Entertainment (UK), acquired by PFE in 1995.
 Abbey Home Entertainment (UK), 75% majority stake acquired by PFE in 1995. Sold back to original owners in 1998.
 A&M Films (theatrical film division of A&M Records)
 Island Pictures (theatrical film division of Island Records), acquired December 1994, closed 1997.
 Cinéa (France)
 PolyGram Video
 Channel 5 Video
 PolyGram Television
 PolyGram Visual Programming

US distribution 
In 1992, PolyGram partnered with Universal Pictures to create a joint venture called Gramercy Pictures. Gramercy primarily distributed PolyGram films in the US, and it doubled as a specialty label for Universal.  In January 1996, PolyGram bought out Universal and in 1997, PolyGram Films was founded to release PFE's mainstream titles in the US, while Gramercy became a low-budget/art-house sublabel. PolyGram Films' first release was The Game. After PolyGram's merger with Universal in 1999, the company merged Gramercy with October Films, which included its subsidiary Rogue Pictures to create USA Films, which eventually became Focus Features. Gramercy was revived in 2015 as a label of Focus Features, but shut down and went dormant the next year.

Selected films 
Among the films directly produced by PFE were:

1970s

1980s

1990s 
{| class="wikitable sortable"
|-
! Release Date
! Title
! Notes
|-
| align="right"| 27 July 1990 || Chicago Joe and the Showgirl || co-production with New Line Cinema and Working Title Films
|-
| align="right"| 17 August 1990 || Wild at Heart || co-production with The Samuel Goldwyn Company (owned by MGM)
|-
| align="right"| 14 September 1990 || Fools of Fortune || co-production with New Line Cinema
|-
| align="right"| 24 May 1991 || Drop Dead Fred || co-production with New Line Cinema and Working Title Films
|-
| align="right"| 21 August 1991 || Barton Fink || co-production with 20th Century Fox and Working Title Films
|-
| align="right"| 15 November 1991 || Driving Me Crazy || co-production with Motion Picture Corporation of America (owned by MGM)
|-
| align="right"| 17 January 1992 || A Gnome Named Gnorm || co-production with Vestron Pictures
|-
| align="right"| 27 March 1992 || Ruby || co-production with Triumph Films
|-
| align="right"| 15 May 1992 || Rubin & Ed || co-production with Working Title Films
|-
| align="right"| 19 June 1992 || Batman Returns || distributed by Warner Bros.; co-production with DC Entertainment
|-
| align="right"| 7 August 1992 || London Kills Me || distributed by New Line Cinema; co-production with Fine Line Features
|-
| align="right"| 4 September 1992 || Bob Roberts || distributed by Paramount Pictures; co-production with Miramax Films, Live Entertainment and Working Title Films
|-
| align="right"| 16 October 1992 || Candyman || distributed by TriStar Pictures; co-production with Propaganda Films
|-
| align="right"| 23 April 1993 || Map of the Human Heart || distributed by Miramax Films; co-production with Working Title Films
|-
| align="right"| 14 May 1993 || Posse || distributed by Gramercy Pictures; co-production with Working Title Films (owned by MGM)
|-
| align="right"| 20 August 1993 || The Ballad of Little Jo || distributed by New Line Cinema; co-production with Fine Line Features
|-
| align="right"| 3 September 1993 || Kalifornia || distributed by Gramercy Pictures; co-production with Propaganda Films (owned by MGM)
|-
| align="right"| 1 October 1993 || Malice || distributed by Columbia Pictures; co-production with New Line Cinema, Castle Rock Entertainment and Nelvana
|-
| align="right"| 8 October 1993 || The Young Americans || distributed by Live Entertainment; co-production with Working Title Films (co-owned by Universal and Lionsgate)
|-
| align="right"| 5 November 1993 || A Home of Our Own || distributed by Gramercy Pictures (owned by MGM)
|-
| align="right"| 7 January 1994 || The Air Up There || distributed by Hollywood Pictures; co-production with Interscope Communications
|-
| align="right"| 4 February 1994 || Romeo Is Bleeding || distributed by Gramercy Pictures; co-production with Working Title FilmsMost 1994-95 PolyGram films currently owned by MGM
|-
| align="right"| 9 March 1994 || Four Weddings and a Funeral || distributed by Gramercy Pictures; co-production with Working Title Films and Channel Four Films
|-
| align="right"| 11 March 1994 || The Hudsucker Proxy || distributed by Warner Bros.; co-production with Working Title Films and Silver Pictures
|-
| align="right"| 8 April 1994 || Holy Matrimony || distributed by Buena Vista Pictures; co-production with Hollywood Pictures and Interscope Communications
|-
| align="right"| 15 April 1994 || Backbeat || distributed by Gramercy Pictures (owned by Universal)
|-
| align="right"| 6 May 1994 || Dream Lover || distributed by Gramercy Pictures; co-production with Propaganda Films
|-
| align="right"| 18 May 1994 || Final Combination || co-production with Propaganda Films
|-
| align="right"| 15 July 1994 || A Pig's Tale || distributed by PolyGram Filmed Entertainment; co-production with Propaganda Films (owned by Universal)
|-
| align="right"| 10 August 1994 || The Adventures of Priscilla, Queen of the Desert || distributed by Gramercy Pictures
|-
| align="right"| 23 September 1994 || Terminal Velocity || distributed by Hollywood Pictures; co-production with Interscope Communications
|-
| align="right"| 28 September 1994 || Jason's Lyric || distributed by Gramercy Pictures; co-production with Propaganda Films
|-
| align="right"| 16 December 1994 || Nell || distributed by 20th Century Fox (co-owned by MGM and Disney)
|-
| align="right"| 20 January 1995 || S.F.W. || distributed by Gramercy Pictures; co-production with Propaganda Films
|-
| align="right"| 10 February 1995 || Shallow Grave || distributed by Gramercy Pictures in the United States; Columbia TriStar Film Distributors International handled international distribution
|-
| align="right"| 24 February 1995 || Before the Rain || distributed by Gramercy Pictures (owned by Universal)
|-
| align="right"| 17 March 1995 || Candyman: Farewell to the Flesh || distributed by Gramercy Pictures; co-production with Propaganda Films
|-
| align="right"| 21 April 1995 || The Basketball Diaries || distributed by New Line Cinema; co-production with Island Pictures
|-
| align="right"| 3 May 1995 || Panther || distributed by Gramercy Pictures; co-production with Working Title Films
|-
| align="right"| 5 May 1995 || French Kiss || distributed by 20th Century Fox; co-production with Working Title Films
|-
| align="right"| 16 June 1995 || Batman Forever || distributed by Warner Bros.; co-production with DC Entertainment
|-
| align="right"| 30 June 1995 || Innocent Lies ||
|-
| align="right"| 28 July 1995 || Operation Dumbo Drop || distributed by Buena Vista Pictures; co-production with Walt Disney Pictures and Interscope Communications
|-
| align="right"| 16 August 1995 || The Usual Suspects || distributed by Gramercy Pictures; co-production with Bad Hat Harry Productions and Spelling Films
|-
| align="right"| 15 September 1995 ||  Coldblooded || distributed by IRS Media; co-production with Motion Picture Corporation of America and Propaganda Films (owned by Universal)
|-
| align="right"| 22 September 1995 || Canadian Bacon || distributed by Gramercy Pictures; co-production with Propaganda Films
|-
| align="right"| 29 September 1995 || Moonlight and Valentino || distributed by Gramercy Pictures; co-production with Working Title Films
|-
| align="right"| 3 November 1995 || Home for the Holidays || distributed by Paramount Pictures
|-
| align="right"| 10 November 1995 || Carrington || distributed by Gramercy Pictures
|-
| align="right" | 15 December 1995 || Jumanji || distributed by Sony Pictures Releasing; co-production with TriStar Pictures and Interscope Communications
|-
| align="right"| 28 December 1995 || 12 Monkeys || UK distribution; produced by Universal Pictures and Classico|-
| align="right"| 29 December 1995 || Dead Man Walking || distributed by Gramercy Pictures; co-production with Working Title Films
|-
| align="right"| 29 December 1995 || Mr. Holland's Opus || distributed by Hollywood Pictures; co-production with Interscope Communications
|-
| align="right"| 9 February 1996 || Loch Ness || distributed by Gramercy Pictures; co-production with Working Title Films
|-
| align="right"| 23 February 1996 || La Haine || distributed by Gramercy Pictures; co-production with Le Studio Canal+ and Arte France CinemaMost films released since this point are owned by Universal Pictures
|-
| align="right"| 8 March 1996 || Fargo || distributed by Gramercy Pictures; co-production with Working Title Films (owned by MGM)
|-
| align="right" rowspan="2"| 22 March 1996 || Jack and Sarah || distributed by Gramercy Pictures; co-production with Granada Productions and Le Studio Canal+ (owned by MGM)
|-
| Land and Freedom || distributed by Gramercy Pictures; co-production with Working Title Films
|-
| align="right"| 3 May 1996 || Barb Wire || distributed by Gramercy Pictures; co-production with Propaganda Films
|-
| align="right"|31 May 1996 || Eddie || distributed by Hollywood Pictures; co-production with Island Pictures (co-owned by Disney and MGM)Final PolyGram film currently owned by Metro-Goldwyn-Mayer
|-
| align="right"|31 May 1996 || The Arrival || distributed by Orion Pictures; co-production with LIVE Entertainment, Steelework Films and Interscope Communications
|-
| align="right"|17 July 1996 || Walking and Talking || distributed by Miramax Films; co-production with Channel Four Films, Zenith Productions, Pandora Film, Mikado Films (France), Electric, TEAM Communications Group and Good Machine
|-
| align="right"|17 July 1996 || Kazaam || distributed by Buena Vista Pictures; co-production with Touchstone Pictures and Interscope Communications
|-
| align="right"|19 July 1996 || Trainspotting || distributed by Miramax Films; co-production with Channel Four Films
|-
| align="right"|18 October 1996 || Sleepers  || distributed by Warner Bros.; co-production with Propaganda Films
|-
| align="right"|18 October 1996 || Jude || distributed by Gramercy Pictures
|-
| align="right"|24 December 1996 || The Portrait of a Lady || distributed by Gramercy Pictures; co-production with Propaganda Films
|-
| align="right"|10 January 1997 || The Relic || distributed by Paramount Pictures; co-production with Tele-München Gruppe, BBC, Toho-Towa, Pacific Western Production, Marubeni and Cloud Nine Entertainment
|-
| align="right"|29 January 1997 || Gridlock'd || distributed by Gramercy Pictures; co-production with Interscope Communications
|-
| align="right"|14 February 1997 || When We Were Kings || distributed by Gramercy Pictures
|-
| align="right"|7 March 1997 || The Eighth Day || distributed by Gramercy Pictures; co-production with Working Title Films
|-
| align="right"|11 April 1997 || Keys to Tulsa || distributed by Gramercy Pictures; co-production with ITC Entertainment (owned by ITV Studios)
|-
| align="right"|9 May 1997 || Twin Town || distributed by Gramercy Pictures
|-
| align="right"|20 June 1997 || Batman & Robin || distributed by Warner Bros.; co-production with DC Entertainment
|-
| align="right"|6 August 1997 || Def Jam's How to Be a Player || distributed by Gramercy Pictures
|-
| align="right"|24 August 1997 || Snow White: A Tale of Terror || co-production with Interscope Communications
|-
| align="right"|12 September 1997 || The Game || distributed by PolyGram Films; co-production with Propaganda Films
|-
| align="right"|19 September 1997 || Going All the Way || distributed by Gramercy Pictures
|-
| align="right"|3 October 1997 || The Matchmaker || distributed by Gramercy Pictures; co-production with Working Title Films
|-
| align="right"|24 October 1997 || A Life Less Ordinary || distributed by 20th Century Fox
|-
| align="right"|7 November 1997 || Bean || distributed by Gramercy Pictures; co-production with Working Title Films
|-
| align="right" |5 December 1997 || The Borrowers || distributed by PolyGram Films; co-production with Working Title Films
|-
| align="right"|16 January 1998 || Hard Rain || distributed by Paramount Pictures; co-production with BBC Films, Mutual Film Company, Nordisk Film Production and Toho
|-
| align="right" rowspan="2"|23 January 1998 || Spice World || distributed by Sony Pictures Releasing; co-production with Columbia Pictures, Icon Productions and Fragile Films
|-
| The Gingerbread Man || distributed by PolyGram Films; co-production with Island Pictures and Enchanter Entertainment
|-
| align="right"|18 February 1998 || I Want You || distributed by Gramercy Pictures
|-
| align="right"|26 February 1998 || Dead Letter Office || distributed by Southern Star Entertainment
|-
| align="right"|6 March 1998 || The Big Lebowski || distributed by Gramercy Pictures; co-production with Working Title Films
|-
| align="right" rowspan="3"|3 April 1998 || No Looking Back || distributed by Gramercy Pictures
|-
| The Proposition || distributed by PolyGram Films; co-production with Interscope Communications
|-
| Barney's Great Adventure: The Movie || distributed by PolyGram Films; co-production with Lyrick Studios
|-
| align="right" rowspan="2"|1 May 1998 || Wilde || distributed by Sony Pictures Classics; co-production with BBC Films, Capitol Films and Pony Canyon
|-
| Go Now || distributed by Gramercy Pictures
|-
| align="right"|29 May 1998 || The Last Days of Disco || distributed by Gramercy Pictures in North America and Warner Bros. internationally; co-production with Castle Rock Entertainment
|-
| align="right"|12 June 1998 || The Land Girls || distributed by Gramercy Pictures
|-
| align="right"|14 August 1998 || Return to Paradise || distributed by PolyGram Films; co-production with Propaganda Films and Tetragram
|-
| align="right"|21 August 1998 || Your Friends & Neighbors || distributed by Gramercy Pictures
|-
| align="right"|25 September 1998 || Clay Pigeons || distributed by Gramercy Pictures
|-
| align="right"|2 October 1998 || What Dreams May Come || distributed by PolyGram Films; co-production with Interscope Communications
|-
| align="right"|13 November 1998 || Thursday || distributed by Gramercy Pictures; co-production with Propaganda Films
|-
| align="right"|22 November 1998 || Elizabeth || distributed by Gramercy Pictures; co-production with StudioCanal, Working Title Films and Channel Four Films
|-
| align="right"|25 November 1998 || Very Bad Things || distributed by PolyGram Films; co-production with Interscope Communications
|-
| align="right"|22 January 1999 || The Hi-Lo Country || distributed by Gramercy Pictures; co-production with Working Title Films
|-
| align="right"| February 1999 || Choke || distributed by PolyGram Visual Programming; co-production with Propaganda Films
|-
| align="right"|5 March 1999 || Lock, Stock and Two Smoking Barrels || distributed by Gramercy Pictures; co-production with The Steve Tisch Company, SKA Films, HandMade Films and Summit Entertainment
|-
| align="right"|1 April 1999 || Millionaire Dogs || distributed by Pop Twist Entertainment in U.S.; co-production with Ostdeutscher Rundfunk Brandenburg, EIV Entertainment Invest GmbH & Company KG, Zweites Deutsches Fernsehen and Benchmark Entertainment
|-
| align="right"|28 May 1999 || Notting Hill || distributed by Universal Pictures; co-production with Working Title Films
|-
| align="right"|9 July 1999 || Arlington Road || distributed by Screen Gems; co-production with Lakeshore Entertainment
|-
| align="right"|1 October 1999 || Plunkett & Macleane || distributed by USA Films; co-production with Working Title Films
|}

 See also 
 Working Title Films 100 Films and a Funeral, a documentary film about the rise and fall of PFE.

 References 

 Further reading 
 Michael Kuhn, One Hundred Films and a Funeral: The Life and Death of Polygram Films'', Thorogood, 2002.  .

Film production companies of the United Kingdom
Entertainment companies established in 1975
Film distributors of the United Kingdom
Defunct companies based in London
Entertainment companies based in California
1975 establishments in England
Re-established companies
Universal Pictures
Companies disestablished in 2000